The Colour Experience (formerly known as The Colour Museum) is a visitor attraction and museum in Bradford, West Yorkshire, England.

The museum covers the science of light and colour. It is run by the Society of Dyers and Colourists as an educational charity.
Educational workshops are provided for school groups.

See also 

 Gordon Rintoul, former curator.

References

External links 

 Colour Experience website

Museums in Bradford
Tourist attractions in Bradford
Science museums in England
Color organizations